Edward Bertram Garland (January 9, 1895 – January 22, 1980) was a New Orleans jazz string bass player. He was commonly known as Ed Garland, and sometimes Montudie Garland (a nickname he disliked).

Biography 

Ed Garland was born in New Orleans on January 9, 1895. By about 1910, he was playing bass drum with brass bands including Frankie Duson's Eagle Band. He then took up tuba and string bass; like many New Orleans bassists of the era, he doubled on the two instruments which filled similar roles in different types of bands. He played with the Excelsior Brass Band and Manuel Perez's Imperial Orchestra. He joined other early New Orleans bands that played in Chicago and California, playing with Lawrence Duhé, Joe "King" Oliver, and Freddie Keppard. In 1916 Garland joined King Oliver and went to California. He led his own One-Eleven Jazz Band during the Depression.

In 1944 Garland became best known as a member of a traditional New Orleans band that was a leader of the West Coast revival, put together for the CBS Radio series The Orson Welles Almanac. The all-star band also included Mutt Carey, Jimmie Noone (succeeded by Barney Bigard), Kid Ory, Bud Scott, Zutty Singleton and Buster Wilson. Renamed Kid Ory's Creole Jazz Band, the group then made a significant series of recordings on the Crescent Records label.

Garland appeared in the 1959 film Imitiation of Life, performing with Andrew Blakeney, Teddy Buckner, George Orendorf and Joe Darensbourg in the funeral sequence ("Trouble of the World") featuring Mahalia Jackson.

Garland died in London, England.

References

External links 
 1944 Orson Welles Broadcasts at The Kid Ory Archive
 1945 Jade Palace at The Kid Ory Archive
 Kid Ory's Creole Jazz Band: 1944–1945 The Legendary Crescent Recording Sessions at AllMusic (Scott Yanow)

Jazz musicians from New Orleans
Dixieland jazz musicians
1895 births
1980 deaths
American jazz double-bassists
Male double-bassists
20th-century American musicians
20th-century double-bassists
20th-century American male musicians
American male jazz musicians
The Eagle Band members